Major-General Claude Douglas Hamilton Moore  (9 February 1875 – September 1928) was a British Army officer.

Military career
Moore was commissioned into the Suffolk Regiment on 27 November 1895. After transferring to the Royal Warwickshire Regiment, he fought in the Second Boer War and also saw action on the Western Front in the early stages of the First World War for which he was appointed a Companion of the Distinguished Service Order. He became commander of the 157th (Highland Light Infantry) Brigade serving in the Middle Eastern theatre in October 1916 before later becoming commander of the Ahmednagar Brigade in India in January 1920.

He was appointed a Companion of the Order of the Bath in the 1925 Birthday Honours and became General Officer Commanding 42nd (East Lancashire) Infantry Division in March 1927 before his death in September 1928.

References

1875 births
1928 deaths
Companions of the Order of the Bath
Companions of the Order of St Michael and St George
Companions of the Distinguished Service Order
Suffolk Regiment officers
British Army generals of World War I
British Army major generals